The Talisman Ring is a historical romance novel by Georgette Heyer, first published in 1936. Set in 1793, in the Georgian era, the action takes place in Sussex, where Heyer then lived.

Like several of Heyer's early novels including Regency Buck (1935) and The Corinthian (1940), The Talisman Ring blends the genres of romantic comedy and thriller. Jane Aiken Hodge describes it as a "neat comedy" and "very nearly a detective story in period costume". In counterpointing an older and a younger couple, the novel is a forerunner of many of Heyer's later works, such as Frederica (1965). The Talisman Ring is also the first of Heyer's novels to feature characters from the Bow Street Runners.

Plot summary
On his deathbed, Baron Lavenham arranges a marriage between his great-nephew, Sir Tristram Shield, and his young French granddaughter, Eustacie de Vauban. His grandson and heir, Ludovic, is on the run on the Continent, after allegedly murdering a man in a dispute over a valuable heirloom, the talisman ring. The romantic Eustacie, appalled by her betrothed's phlegmatic character, runs away and soon encounters a smuggler, who turns out to be her cousin Ludovic. The two take refuge at a local inn, after Ludovic is injured escaping from Excisemen. There they encounter an older lady, Miss Sarah Thane, who vows to help them.

After finding her bandboxes and meeting the Excisemen following the smugglers on the blood trail from Ludovic's injury, Tristram decides to follow them under the impression that Eustacie encountered trouble from the smugglers. At the hotel, against Sarah Thane's efforts he conducts the excisemen towards Eustacie and Ludovic. Tristram recognises him, but leads the others to believe that he is one of Lord Sylvester's bastards, much to the former's crossness, to account for the resemblance. When they leave he examines Ludovic's hands and pronounces innocence as the ring is not on them. Together with Sarah Thane, now a loyal accomplice and Eustacie's self-appointed chaperon, they conclude that the murderer is no other than Basil and hatch a plan to break into his home at the Dower House.

On the course of the next days Tristram spreads the word that Eustacie ran to meet Sarah Thane whom she knew from Paris to smooth over the ripples of her escape. It is concluded that Eustacie will stay with Sarah, to protect Ludovic, and thus Basil pays her a visit there. During the discussion Eustacie pretends that for architectural reasons Sarah would very much like to visit the Dower House and Basil invites them both there. They go and after a while they are joined by Tristram whom Basil "sends" to show Miss Thane the house around when Eustacie requests that they talk in private. They leave without finding the ring but the butler, having seem them knock on the panels in the house, shares that to Basil who understands at once that they know. Recollecting that his butler has spoken to the Excisemen he asks for the appearance of the "bastard" and realising who it is calls in the Bow Street Runners.

The residents of the Red Lion inn get rid of them after making them believe that Sarah is Ludovic dressed in women's clothes and professing indulgence on their blunder. Basil then lays a trap announcing that he is going to London. Hearing this, Ludovic tries, against all advice to break into the house and escapes later with the help of Tristram, summoned by Miss Thane. Basil next tries to break into the inn and kill Ludovic but is stopped by Sir Hugh, and in the struggle, he loses a quizzing glass. The next morning Sir Tristram realises that the quizzing glass is rather disproportionate and after several tries he finds the ring in the shaft. The next morning he calls the Bow Street Runners and lays a trap for Basil who, while trying to escape, punches Miss Thane on the temple. She wakes up with Tristram is nursing her, and is rather annoyed when he proposes to her in her state, though she confesses later on "I have been meaning to marry you these ten days and more!”.

Characters
Sir Tristram Shield – Great-nephew to Sylvester, Lord Lavenham, cousin to Basil and Ludovic Lavenham and Eustacie de Vauban.
A connoisseur of fine craftsmanship and a collector of works of art, Sir Tristram is summoned to Lavenham Court only to be informed that he is expected to marry his cousin Eustacie de Vauban in the place of Ludovic Lavenham. The idea does not please him, for she is too fanciful and romantic for his liking. He is one of the suspects in Sir Matthew Plunkett's murder case, suspected for having done it to add the talisman ring to his collection. However, although he is not a romantically minded man, being past the age of fancifulness at 31, he becomes enmeshed into the mystery and the responsibility of protecting Ludovic Lavenham from arrest. His is the voice of reason that controls Eustacie, Ludovic and Sarah Thane's high flights of fancy and absurd plans, but he is by no means a stultifying influence, being as keen as anyone to clear Ludovic's name following the discovery that he does not have the talisman ring on him (therefore, he cannot be the murderer of Plunkett)

Miss Sarah Thane – Sister to Sir Hugh Thane. One of Heyer's more striking early heroines, Sarah Thane is an enchantingly perverse and very humorous lady of twenty-eight, who scandalises her relations by accompanying her brother everywhere he goes, and in recent years, leaving her chaperone behind. A very candid woman, who would probably remain unsurprised by anything life threw at her, she is quite capable of looking after herself, and blends an incredibly romantic imagination with common good sense and charming sensibility. When Eustacie de Vauban brings the wounded Ludovic Lavenham to the Red Lion, Sarah Thane is only too delighted to take part in this exciting adventure coming her way. Well aware of her short-comings, with a very skilled talent for acting as if she were perfectly silly, she makes a perfect foil to Sir Tristram from the very moment they are brought together. Despite being, in her words, "a creature of no importance at all", she is, on the contrary a very important character and the forerunner of Heyer's later heroines Abigail Wendover (Black Sheep) and Hester Theale (Sprig Muslin).

Mademoiselle Eustacie de Vauban – Granddaughter to Sylvester, Lord Lavenham, cousin to Sir Tristram Shield and Basil and Ludovic Lavenham. Comparisons to Léonie de Saint Vire of These Old Shades spring to mind instantly, although other than their French descent, youth and a similar volatility, there is very little in common between Léonie and Eustacie. Eustacie, the dark-haired, beautiful heroine is more romantically minded and less bloodthirsty. Disgusted by the idea of being married to the unromantic Sir Tristram Shield, she runs away and falls into the hands of Ludovic Lavenham, the wicked cousin who has much intrigued and fascinated her. Her appetite for adventure is satisfied in the excitement of keeping him out of the hands of the Bow Street Runners and Excisemen, and of helping to prove his innocence. Perhaps closest in character to Amanda Smith in Sprig Muslin, she set the mould for many of Heyer's romantically minded and unrealistic young beauties such as Lady Letitia Merion in April Lady and Miss Tiffany Wield in The Nonesuch, although she is nowhere near as irrational as either of those two.

Ludovic Lavenham – Grandson to Sylvester, Lord Lavenham, cousin to Basil Lavenham, Sir Tristram Shield and Eustacie de Vauban. Accused of murdering Sir Matthew Plunkett to retrieve an heirloom talisman ring which was won from him in a rigged game, Ludovic Lavenham fled the country two years before the book's period with the assistance of his grandfather and cousin Tristram. Since then, he has taken up free-trading and smuggling, using The Red Lion inn as a headquarters. When Eustacie de Vauban runs away from home and falls into his hands, it triggers off a sequence of events during which he is shot, has to evade the Bow Street Runners whilst invalided, and prove his innocence of Sir Matthew's murder with the assistance of Eustacie, Sir Hugh and Sarah Thane and Sir Tristram. Although something of an incorrigible rogue, Ludovic is a very romantic character who fascinates Eustacie, and whatever his flaws, he is no brutal villain. His chivalry in preventing Ned Bundy from killing Eustacie from the start, his bravery and somewhat reckless spirit make him rather a devil-may-care fellow but he is a typical example of a wronged romantic hero with a name to clear, a role which is most comparable to that of Jack Carstares in Heyer's first novel, The Black Moth

Lavenham, Basil. "Beau Lavenham" – Great nephew to Lord Sylvester Lavenham, cousin to Eustacie de Vauban, Ludovic Lavenham and Sir Tristram Shield. Basil Lavenham, a typical dandy with his coquelicot-striped waistcoats and spotted silk coats; is not particularly liked by any of his relations. He is an exquisite of the first degree, composed of delicate mannerisms and niceties of dress; with a languid manner and a soft voice. One of Eustacie de Vauban's suitors, she does not like him in the slightest. Despite his apparent ineffectiveness, however, Beau Lavenham is a devious man capable of almost anything.

Sylvester Lavenham – Grandfather to Ludovic Lavenham and Eustacie de Vauban, great-uncle to Sir Tristram Shield and Basil Lavenham. An eighty-year-old man on his deathbed at the start of the novel, Sylvester used to be a rake in his day, but is now a frail, garrulous old man who still insists on being bewigged and patched despite his invalid status. He has also refused to lie back and wait to die, having summoned Sir Tristram Shield to be married to his great-niece Eustacie. At the last moment, having forbidden his grandson's name to be mentioned in the house, Sylvester has doubts about Ludovic Lavenham's guilt. The most telling note of his character is that it is clearly appropriate that his last words should be a vulgar oath aimed at his doctor.

Sir Hugh Thane – Brother of Sarah Thane. A Justice of the Peace, he decides to stay at The Red Lion en route to London due to the excellence of their smuggled brandy. He is a placid, rather easy-going gentleman, who often travels around Europe with his sister Sarah. Due to his contracting a severe cold, he and Sarah are compelled to prolong their stay at the Red Lion, and this allows him to be a severe hindrance to the Bow Street Runners and a great help to the efforts to prove Ludovic Lavenham's innocence. His connections with Bow Street and the courts of law do not make him a strict upholder of the law, and he is an implicit approver of smuggling. Although he states he will tell the truth, he also remarks that nobody will ask him.

Sir Matthew John Pluckett – The person who won Ludovic Lavenham's precious ring in a rigged game, and was later shot, of which crime Ludovic Lavenham stands accused. It is his murder that forms the mystery of the book.

References

Goodreads

Sources
Hodge, J. A. The Private World of Georgette Heyer. Bodley Head, 1984; reprinted Arrow Books, 2004.
Heyerlist.com

1936 British novels
Novels by Georgette Heyer
Historical novels
Novels set in Sussex
Fiction set in 1793
Heinemann (publisher) books
British romance novels